Madavan-e Olya (also Romanized as Mādavān-e ‘Olyā; also known as Mādavān-e Bālā) is a city in Sarrud-e Shomali Rural District, in the Central District of Boyer-Ahmad County, Kohgiluyeh and Boyer-Ahmad Province, Iran. At the 2006 census, its population was 7,109, in 1,403 families.

References 

Populated places in Boyer-Ahmad County